Maharana Amar Singh I, the Maharana of Mewar (March 16, 1559 – January 26, 1620), was the eldest son and successor of Maharana Pratap of Mewar. He was the 16th Rana of Mewar dynasty of Sisodia Rajputs and ruler of Mewar from January 19, 1597 till his death on January 26, 1620. His capital was Udaipur.

Birth and coronation
Amar Singh was the eldest son of Maharana Pratap. He was born in Chittor on 16 March 1559 to Maharana Pratap and Maharani Ajabde Punwar, the same year, when foundation of Udaipur was laid by his grandfather, Udai Singh II. Amar Singh succeeded Maharana Pratap upon his death on 19 January 1597.

Reign

In start of his reign, Amar Singh implemented internal reforms. He defined the order of precedence for his chiefs, and their privileges. He also rehabilitated people, who were displaced due to Mughal invasions, settled them in many villages,  including Kelwa, Muroli and Rampura.

He appointed Hari Das Jhala as the commander of his standing army and made large collection of armour for his offensives against Mughals.

Mughal invasions

Salim over Mewar in 1599 

Prince Salim invaded Mewar in 1599. His generals established posts in Oontala, Mohi, Bagore, Mandalgarh, Chittor and several places. Rajputs attacked and killed Sultan Khan Ghori at his post of Bagore, they defeated garrison of Rampura. Kayum Khan was killed in Oontala and Oontala was captured by Mewari forces. Many Mughal outposts were captured, but Rajputs also suffered losses. Mughal burnt the crops, ravaged the fields, capturing anyone they could find. Eventually, this failed operation was over when Salim returned from Mewar, he was asked to go to Bengal.

Prince Salim was sent over Mewar again in 1603, but he refused to move to Mewar.

Parvez over Mewar in 1605
When Jahangir came to the throne, he sent army of 22,000 horses, with artillery under the command of Parvez over Mewar Nov 1605, with instructions to make negotiations peacefully, provided Amar Singh agrees to owe allegiance to Mughal Throne.   Amar Singh sent his army to frontiers of Desuri, Mandalgarh, Bandor and Mandal, to face the invading Mughal army.
The invading army was badly defeated near Dewair pass. Mughals couldn't make much progress and later, Parvez returned when Khusro revolted.

Mahabat Khan over Mewar in 1608
Mahabat Khan was sent in 1608. Mahabat Khan met with success and he reached till near Girwa, Udaipur, causing death and destruction along the route.
It was at Oontala, that Megh Singh Chundawat of Begun attacked Mughals. Later, Mahabat Khan left Mewar in despair.

Abdullah Khan over Mewar in 1609
Abdullah Khan was sent over Mewar in 1609. Abdullah Khan forced Rana to quit Chawand and Merpur but Rajputs retaliated by attacking Mugal territory of Malwa, Godwar, Gujarat and Ajmer. 
Abdullah Khan was defeated in a fierce battle near Ranakpur in 1611, in which several chiefs of Mewar including Duda Sangawat, Narayandas Sonagara, Surajmal, Aaskaran, Haridas Mertiya, Deda Jhala, Keshavdas Chauhan and MukundDas Rathore laid down their lives. 
 
Abdullah Khan was sent to Gujarat in Aug, 1611.

Raja Basu over Mewar in 1612
In 1612, Raja Basu was sent over Mewar but couldn’t succeed and was called back after being suspected of colluding with Rajputs.

Mirza Aziz Koka in Mewar in 1613

Raja Basu was replaced by Mirza Aziz Koka in 1613. But he also couldn't achieve any progress.

Khurram over Mewar in 1613

In Sep 1613, Jahangir himself came to Ajmer and sent Khurram over Mewar.

Treaty in 1615

After Mewar was devastated financially and in manpower due to several battles against the Mughals, Amar Singh thought it prudent to start negotiations with them and finally, entered into a treaty with Shah Jahan (who negotiated on behalf of Jahangir) in 1615. He was advised by his council and his grandmother, Jaiwanta Bai, his advisor. 

In the treaty, it was agreed that: 

The ruler of Mewar, will not be bound to present himself in person at Mughal court, instead, a relative of the Rana would wait upon the Mughal Emperor and serve him.  
It was also agreed that the Ranas of Mewar would not enter matrimonial relations with the Mughals. 
Mewar would have to keep a contingent of 1500 horsemen in the Mughal service. 
Chittor and other Mughal occupied areas of Mewar would be returned to the Rana, but Chittor fort would never be repaired. The reason for this last condition was that the Chittor fort was a very powerful bastion and the mughals were wary of it being used in any future rebellion.
The Rana would be given a Mughal rank of 5000 zat and 5000 sowar.
The rulers of Dungarpur and Banswarra (who had become independent during Akbars reign) would once again become vassals of Mewar and pay tribute to the Rana.

After the treaty, the territories around Chittor along with the Chittor Fort were given back to Mewar, as goodwill gesture. However, Udaipur remained the capital of Mewar State.

Qualities
Amar Singh was admired for his bravery, leadership, valour, and sense of justice and kindness. He showed great valour against the Mughals due to which he was given the title 'Chakraveer'.
Famous manuscript of Ragmala, with early Rajputana miniature paintings was completed by Nisaradi, during reign of Maharana Amar Singh in Chawand in 1605. Amar Singh built Badal Mahal in Udaipur and built Amargarh fort in Jahajpur.

Death
Amar Singh died on 26 January 1620 at Udaipur and was succeeded by his eldest son Karan Singh II.

Cultural activities 

Amar Singh patronized an author called Mathuratmaja ("son of Mathura"), who wrote Amara-bhushana (IAST: Amarabhūṣaṇa) and Ishta-ghatika-shodhana (Iṣṭaghaṭikāśodhana). These works are sometimes attributed to Amar Singh (Amara-siṃha) himself.

See also
Chundawat
Shaktawat

Notes

References
 
 

 
 
 
 
 

1559 births
1620 deaths
Rajput rulers
17th-century Indian monarchs
History of Rajasthan
Maharana Pratap
Mewar dynasty
Hindu monarchs